Ebrahim Alidokht (born 26 October 1967) is an Iranian table tennis player. He competed in the 1992 Summer Olympics.

References

External links
 

1967 births
Living people
Table tennis players at the 1992 Summer Olympics
Iranian male table tennis players
Olympic table tennis players of Iran